The Stroke Alliance for Europe (SAFE) is a non-profit coalition of European charities all connected with improving healthcare provided to stroke survivors. 
It represents a range of patient groups from across Europe whose mutual goal is to drive stroke prevention and awareness and promote prevention of stroke through education.

The Stroke Alliance for Europe was formed by the European Parliament in 2004.

External links 
 SAFE Website

Organizations established in 2004
Health charities in the United Kingdom
International medical associations of Europe
Stroke organizations